Frog Jump, Tennessee is the name of two unincorporated communities:

Frog Jump, Crockett County, Tennessee
Frog Jump, Gibson County, Tennessee